Dale Carver (born March 5, 1961) is a former American football linebacker. He played for the Cleveland Browns in 1983.

References

1961 births
Living people
American football linebackers
Georgia Bulldogs football players
Cleveland Browns players